The 1st Jharkhand Assembly was constituted based on the 2000 Bihar Legislative Assembly election after the formation of the new Jharkhand state. Jharkhand was created by carving out the southern districts of Bihar on 15 November 2000. 

After the formation of Jharkhand on 15 November 2000, the first Legislative Assembly of Jharkhand was constituted by the MLAs elected in the 2000 Bihar Legislative Assembly election, whose constituencies were in the newly formed Jharkhand. It was a hung assembly and no single party or pre-election alliance got the majority.

The 2005 Jharkhand Legislative Assembly election was the first one being conducted in Jharkhand.

References

1st
2000 establishments in Jharkhand
2000